Jean-François Mayet (born 30 January 1940 in Vatan, Indre) is a member of the Senate of France, representing the Indre department.  He is a member of the Union for a Popular Movement.

References
Page on the Senate website

1940 births
Living people
People from Indre
Union for a Popular Movement politicians
Gaullism, a way forward for France
French Senators of the Fifth Republic
Senators of Indre